The Windward Islands Hurricane was a strong, destructive hurricane that raged through the eastern Caribbean islands in the early part of September during the 1898 Atlantic hurricane season. An estimated 392 people died as a result of the storm. Damage on Barbados and St. Vincent was catastrophic.

Meteorological history

The storm developed in the south central Atlantic from an easterly wave out of Africa. The storm steadily strengthened and reached the Windward Islands as a Category 2 hurricane on the Saffir–Simpson hurricane scale. The hurricane roared directly over Barbados with sustained winds in excess of 100 mph. The effect was devastating. The hurricane maintained intensity and actually strengthened to near-major hurricane force. It turned slowly north, passing close to Saint Vincent and the Grenadines, St. Lucia and Martinique. Exiting the islands, still a Category 2 storm, it continued north and then curved northeast near Bermuda. The storm finally became extratropical before crossing Newfoundland, having maintained hurricane strength for 13 consecutive days.

Impact 
The storm caused devastating damage throughout the eastern Caribbean islands. Barbados and St. Vincent sustained the most damage. The estimated number of fatalities is 392. No damage figures exist but the destruction was very heavy and widespread in many places. Estimates run in the millions of dollars, uninflated.

In Barbados, 83 deaths and 150 injuries were reported. About 5,062 houses were completely destroyed, while 2,359 others suffered damage. Between 40,000 and 45,000 people were left homeless. Many streets were left impassable for several days, especially to vehicles. Phone service was completely disrupted as nearly all the power poles on the island were downed. The sugarcane plantations on the island also suffered crippling damage. The hurricane was compared to the “Great Hurricane” of August 1831, in which roughly 1,500 people died and the island of Barbados was practically flattened.

Impact was also severe on Saint Vincent. The villages of Richmond and Wallibou were a "complete wreck", with no houses remaining. In Chateaubelair, many houses were demolished, while a few were still standing after the storm, albeit with severe damage. Forty-five deaths occurred in the village. Similar impact was reported in Cumberland, with one death. Only one house was not destroyed at Barrouallie. Thirty fatalities were reported, eleven of which occurred after a church which people sought refuge in was wrecked. In Layou, only the police barracks remained standing. Throughout Saint Vincent, many people suffered injuries. Numerous large trees were uprooted and weather instruments were destroyed on the island. Nearly a foot of rain fell in just 24 hours. Dozens of boats were lost in the harbors and out at sea. The confirmed death toll for Saint Vincent was about 300.

There was minimal damage in Grenadines, except for Bequia, which was severely affected. At Guadeloupe, the sloop Marie Stella capsized offshore Goyave, drowning nine people. An additional nine deaths occurred after a landslide in Trois-Rivières buried two homes. On St. Lucia, impact was mostly limited to rain and landslides.

See also 

 List of Atlantic hurricanes

References

External links
 1898 Monthly Weather Review
 The Deadliest Atlantic Tropical Cyclones, 1492-1996
 
 

1890s Atlantic hurricane seasons
1898 Windward Islands
Category 2 Atlantic hurricanes
Hurricanes in Saint Vincent and the Grenadines
Hurricanes in Barbados
Hurricanes in the Windward Islands
British Windward Islands
History of British Saint Vincent and the Grenadines
History of the Colony of Barbados
1898 natural disasters
1898 meteorology